Bun Bei Chau is a small island in Sai Kung District, Hong Kong. It is located just off the northeast coast of Town Island near Rocky Harbour.

References

Uninhabited islands of Hong Kong
Sai Kung District
Islands of Hong Kong